KSVG may refer to:

  a Scalable Vector Graphics solution for KHTML based browsers
 KSVG-LP, a low-power radio station (103.5 FM) licensed to serve Bakersfield, California, United States
 KSVG (FM), a defunct radio station (89.7 FM) formerly licensed to serve Mettler, California